The 1969–70 snooker season was a series of snooker tournaments played between July 1969 and April 1970. The following table outlines the results for the season's events.


Calendar

Notes

References

1969
1969 in snooker
1970 in snooker